Joseph Oklahombi (May 1, 1895, Bokchito, Blue County, Choctaw Nation, Indian Territory - April 13, 1960) was an American soldier of the Choctaw nation. He was the most-decorated World War I soldier from Oklahoma. He served in Company D, First Battalion, 141st Regiment, Seventy-first Brigade of the Thirty-sixth Infantry Division during World War I, where he was one of the Choctaw code talkers.

On October 8, 1918, Private Oklahombi was at Saint-Étienne, France. He and 23 other soldiers attacked an enemy position and captured 171 Germans while killing some 79 more. They held their position for four days while under attack. Oklahombi was awarded the Silver Star with Victory Ribbon, and the Croix de Guerre from France's Marshal Henri-Philippe Petain. At the time the members of the Choctaw nation were not formally U.S. citizens.

Oklahombi was married and had a son. He was killed on 13 April 1960 when hit by a truck while walking along a road.  He was buried with military honors at Yashau Cemetery in Broken Bow, Oklahoma.

From Chief Gary Batton of the Choctaw Nation of Oklahoma:

"Many of you know the story of the Choctaw Code Talkers of WWI and WWII and also the story of Code Talker Joseph Oklahombi, who single-handedly captured 171 Germans after moving 200 yards over open ground against artillery and machine gun fire, rushing a machine gun nest and capturing one of the guns. He not only turned the gun on the enemy for four days, keeping them under fire, he was without food and water those four days, killing numerous enemy soldiers until the rest surrendered. Although [retroactively] awarded … the Silver Star and Marshal Pétain, former Commander-in-Chief of the French Armies of the East, awarded him the Croix de Guerre, the Congressional Medal of Honor was never presented. It is a long-overdue recognition and I am working to see the Medal of Honor presented to Oklahombi."

References

1895 births
1960 deaths
Choctaw Nation of Oklahoma people
Native American military personnel
Recipients of the Silver Star
United States Army soldiers
People from Bryan County, Oklahoma
United States Army personnel of World War I
Choctaw code talkers
Recipients of the Croix de Guerre 1914–1918 (France)
Pedestrian road incident deaths
Road incident deaths in Oklahoma
People from McCurtain County, Oklahoma
Military personnel from Oklahoma
20th-century Native Americans